Victoria Park is the premier urban park in Widnes, Cheshire, England. It is managed by Halton Borough Council.

History

The park was opened in 1900 to celebrate the Diamond Jubilee of Queen Victoria. It is on the former Appleton House estate and was created by the local council with funds collected via a public subscription.

Facilities

There are paved walking routes, grass open spaces, formal gardens, a lake with a fountain, a café with toilets, ice cream parlour, children's play area, tennis courts, bowling greens, a skate park, climbing boulder, bandstand, basketball courts, an enclosed dog run and a butterfly house.

Landmarks

The park contains a Grade II listed war memorial pillar. Incorporating detailed carvings and standing more than 16m high, the memorial is a striking and prominent architectural building. The pillar was designed by Harold E Davies and unveiled by the 17th Earl of Derby in a ceremony on 28 September 1921 after a civic parade from Widnes Town Hall. The memorial cost £6,000 and was paid for by public subscription. The sculptural additions were undertaken by the national artist Herbert Tyson Smith.

There is a memorial fountain in honour of William Ewart Gladstone. A milestone marker with plaque commemorates the last effective Zeppelin air raid of World War I in England. Five Zeppelins dropped bombs in Widnes, Ince and Wigan. There is a statue of Sgt. Thomas Mottershead V.C., DCM (1892–1917) who was born in Widnes and was awarded a Victoria Cross and Distinguished Conduct Medal in World War I. There is a combined memorial headstone for Mottershead and two other recipients of the V.C. from Halton: Thomas Wilkinson and Thomas Alfred Jones.

Events

Vintage Steam Rally
Each year the park hosts North West England's largest Vintage Steam Rally, featuring a vintage fair, and vintage steam machinery.

Parkrun
A 5 km parkrun takes place every Saturday morning beginning at 9am.

See also
List of parks and open spaces in Cheshire

References

Parks and open spaces in Cheshire
Widnes